Squeeze are a British rock band active from 1974 to 1982, from 1985 to 1999, and since 2007 to date. Founded by Glenn Tilbrook (vocals), Chris Difford (guitar), Jools Holland (keyboards) and Paul Gunn (drums), the group have released 15 studio albums, 14 compilation albums, 4 live albums, 1 extended play and 48 singles. All Squeeze's hits are written by Glenn Tilbrook and Chris Difford.

Albums

Studio albums

Live albums

Charted compilation albums

Extended plays

Singles

Notes

References

Squeeze (band)
Discographies of British artists
Rock music group discographies
New wave discographies